The Phra Prong River or Khlong Phra Prong is a river in Thailand.

Geography
The Phra Prong originates in the Sankamphaeng Range, a mountainous area between the districts Watthana Nakhon of Sa Kaeo, Lahan Sai of Buriram and Khon Buri of Nakhon Ratchasima.

It flows southwestward and  joins the Hanuman River to become the Bang Pakong River in Kabin Buri District, Prachinburi Province.

References

Phra Prong